Mango Street is a historic street in the Jabal Amman area near downtown Amman, Jordan. Officially named Omar bin al-Khattab Street, the street derives its nickname from the Mango House, a building on the intersection between Mango and Rainbow Streets. Mango Street has an assortment of historic buildings, many being Ottoman, and across the street from the Mango House is Al-Mufti House. Books@Cafe and other locations such as Old View Cafe line the street.

References

Streets in Amman